Flaky pastry, also known as quick pastry, blitz pastry or rough puff, is a light and thin unleavened pastry that is similar to, but distinct from, puff pastry. It is often called quick pastry or blitz pastry in reference to the short time its preparation requires.

Flaky pastry dough is then rolled and folded in a manner similar to puff pastry.

The chunks of shortening keep the rolled particles of dough in the flaky pastry separate from each other, so that when the dough is baked they become flakes. This yields a different texture from puff pastry, where rectangles of dough and fat are rolled and folded together in such a way that the result is a number of uniform sheets of pastry.

Flaky pastry is used to make pasties, turnovers, sausage rolls, and plaits.

See also
List of pastries
Phyllo
Puff pastry
Types of pastry

References 

Pastries
Doughs